The Washington Redhawks was a culture jam created by a group of Native Americans to draw attention to the Washington Redskins name controversy. In 2020, the team retired the Redskins branding amidst the removal of many names and images as part of the George Floyd protests. The football team was later renamed the Washington Commanders in 2022.

Action
On December 13, 2017, a Native American group, Rising Hearts, created several authentic-appearing websites and a Twitter campaign, that seemed to announce that the Washington Redskins had agreed to change its name to the Washington Redhawks for the 2018 season. The sites included one for the team, and for several news outlets: The Washington Post, ESPN, Sports Illustrated and the Bleacher Report. After an initial period, a disclaimer was posted on each spoofed page with a link to a press release explaining the group's action.

The organizers describe their tactic as culture jamming, and state that their intention is to stimulate debate that will eventually lead to an actual name change. Rather than presenting the continued hostility of the debate, their action provided an opportunity for change advocates to write about the positive responses and outcomes that would follow the change.

Rising Hearts Coalition included Rebecca Nagle (Cherokee Nation), Sebastian Medina-Tayac (Piscataway), Valarie Marie Proctor (Cedarville Band of Piscataway), Jair Carrasco, (Aymara), Lindsay Rodriguez (Cheyenne Arapaho), Jordan Marie Daniel (Kul Wicasa Oyate) and Nick Courtney (Makah).

Response
The Washington Redskins posted a message on their own web site stating: "This morning, the Redskins organization was made aware of fraudulent websites about our team name. The name of the team is the Washington Redskins and will remain that for the future."

At a news conference the following day the organizers of Rising Hearts stated that their effort was satire or parody, and were surprised that the Redskins issued a statement denying any plans to change, as if it were serious, or "fake news".

Reaction to the "culture jam" was varied among Native Americans depending upon whether the action was taken seriously or recognized for what it was. Some who took it seriously were elated, then felt betrayed when they found out it was not true. However, the action was supported by some long-time activists on the issue including Suzan Shown Harjo and Jacqueline Keeler, who agreed that it served to stimulate new attention. In an interview, the organizers took exception to the framing of their action as a "hoax", which has negative connotations of intending to mislead, which was not their intent.

Washington Post sports columnist Thomas Boswell wrote based upon his experience when his alma mater, Amherst College, changed its mascot in 2016 from "Lord Jeff" to the "Mammoths". Although he was as attached to his team's mascot as any fan, he understood the reason for the change, and got over it quickly. The reason was letters that were discovered revealing that Lord Jeffery Amherst had advocated the use of smallpox-infected blankets as a weapon against Native Americans not to defeat, but to exterminate them. "Nicknames such as the Lord Jeffs and the Redskins are two illustrations of the same issue. In the beginning, no one means any harm. But once you know better, and don’t change, that's when the harm starts." Boswell later explained that while dropping the team nickname, which was never official, was no big deal; changing the name of the town and college also named for the same person would be difficult.

In Forbes, Demetrius Bell compliments the creators, stating "The best part of any hoax is ultimately how believable the hoax could be and from top to bottom, this is one of the more believable hoaxes that you'll see. If the team did indeed make the incredibly shocking decision to change their nickname and logo, then it wouldn't be a huge shock to see them go the conservative route with a change as relatively simple as this."

In July 2020, the team retired the Redskins branding amidst the removal of many names and images as part of the George Floyd protests. On February 2, 2022, the team was renamed the Washington Commanders.

Parody websites

References

21st-century controversies
Anti-indigenous racism in the United States
Cultural appropriation
National Football League controversies
Native American topics
Native American-related controversies
Sports mascots in the United States
Name controversy